Sherlock, named after fictional detective Sherlock Holmes, was a file and web search tool created by Apple Inc. for the PowerPC-based "classic" Mac OS, introduced with Mac OS 8 as an extension of the Mac OS Finder's file searching capabilities. Like its predecessor (System 7.5’s totally revamped 'Find File' app, adapted by Bill Monk from his 'Find Pro' shareware find program), Sherlock searched for local files and file contents, using the same basic indexing code and search logic found in AppleSearch. Sherlock extended the system by enabling the user to search for items through the World Wide Web through a set of plugins which employed existing web search engines. These plugins were written as plain text files, so that it was a simple task for a user to write a Sherlock plugin.

Sherlock was replaced by Spotlight and Dashboard in Mac OS X 10.4 Tiger, although Apple continued to include it with the default installation. Since most of the standard plug-ins for Sherlock provided by Apple itself no longer function, it was officially retired and removed in the release of Mac OS X 10.5 Leopard in 2007.

Data
The Sherlock 2 search plugin was an SGML document, and was typically given the ".src" file extension. These elements allowed Sherlock to (respectively) identify a search engine's web page and the parts that are relevant to searching, as well as returning the results of the search. There was also a facility for defining how a Sherlock plug-in could update itself.

Sherlock search plugins could also be used (with minor modifications) in Mozilla's browser suites.  These plugins were, appropriately enough, known as Mycroft project plugins (named after Mycroft Holmes, Sherlock Holmes' older brother).  Among some of the changes made in the Sherlock file format were the separation of the automatic update element (which formed part of the  element) and the icon (provided in a separate file in Mozilla and part of the resource fork in Sherlock).

Sherlock 3 channels 
The Sherlock 3 search plugin was a web application, which was downloaded on the fly from a server to ensure the most current version.  As information on the internet is subject to change so quickly, this was one way for Apple to guarantee the up-to-date version.  A channel consisted of a web directory with an index.  This usually pointed to a sub-directory (usually called "Channel") which contained the code XML, any Script XML, and localized lproj directories (nib file and Localized Text Resources as a plist).

The channels included by default were:
Internet
Pictures
Stocks
Movies
eBay
Flights
Dictionary
Translation
AppleCare

Current status 
As Sherlock was never released as a Universal binary, it is not compatible with Mac OS X versions after Mac OS X 10.6 Snow Leopard and couldn't be launched on Intel Macs without Rosetta.

Sherlocked as a term 
Advocates of Watson made by Karelia Software, LLC claim that Apple copied their product without permission, compensation, or attribution in producing Sherlock 3. Some disagree with this claim, stating that Sherlock 3 was the natural evolution of Sherlock 2, and that Watson was obviously meant to have some relation to Sherlock by its very name.

The phenomenon of Apple releasing a feature that supplants or obviates third-party software is so well known that being  has become an accepted term used within the Mac and iOS developer community.

Versions
Sherlock – introduced in Mac OS 8.5.
Sherlock 2 – shipped with Mac OS 9, new interface, more plugins.
Sherlock 3 – shipped with Mac OS X 10.2, runs only in Mac OS X.
Sherlock was replaced by Spotlight in Mac OS X 10.4 Tiger for hard drive searches, and replaced by Dashboard for other functionality, but remained as a stand-alone program with its channels. It was completely removed in Mac OS X 10.5 Leopard.

See also
 OpenSearch

References

External links
 Apple: Sherlock 3 Channel Development
 Karelia: Watson FAQ - See "What is the relationship between Watson and the new Sherlock 3?".
 Karelia: Developing Tools for Watson - See "How does Watson's plug-in architecture compare to Sherlock 3?".
 MyCroft Project opensearch & sherlock search engine plug-ins. Gnome!
 https://wiki.developer.mozilla.org/en-US/docs/Web/API/Window/sidebar/Adding_search_engines_from_Web_pages$revision/1525363#Installing_Sherlock_plugins
 https://web.archive.org/web/20090301182153/http://developer.apple.com/macosx/sherlock/

MacOS-only software made by Apple Inc.
Sherlock Holmes